Danys is a Lithuanian surname. Notable people with the surname include:
Alfonsas Danys (1924 – 2014), Lithuanian writer
 (1914-2005), Lithuanian and Canadian hydrotechnical engineer, professor 
 (1921-2016), Lithuanian physician and therapist, habilitated doctor of biomedical sciences
 (1963–2008), Lithuanian poet and songwriter

See also

Lithuanian-language surnames